Jung Yoon-seok (born April 30, 2003) is a South Korean actor. He won Best Young Actor award in 2009 SBS Drama Awards for his role in Temptation of Wife.

Early life and education 

Born to Korean-Chinese parents, Jung began his acting career in 2006 at age of three.

Jung was born to parents of Korean-Chinese origin in Heilongjiang, China, his parents were naturalized as Korean citizens, and he was born and raised in Seoul. In 2008, the production crew of  mentioned that Jung's parents acquired Korean citizenship.

Unlike Jung, his older sister, whose name is unknown, was born and raised in China and has a Chinese citizenship. When she was 24 years old and living in China, she appeared in a Screening Humanity episode when Jung was 5 years old. From his family, Jung is the youngest son who is 19 years younger than her.

Jung learned to speak a small amount of Chinese from his parents due to the fact that his mother, who had previously appeared in Screening Humanity, where she mentioned that she was teaching him one word a day because she was worried that his older sister in China would not be able to communicate with Jung, who was living in Korea at the time.

In 2019, Jung majored in acting at School of Performing Arts Seoul and graduated in 2022.

Filmography

Television series

Web series

Film

Television shows

Theater

Musical

Play

Ambassadorship 
In 2013, Jung was appointed as the ambassador for the 13th Korea Youth Creation Film Festival. From 2016 to 2018, he and Kim Ji-young were appointed as the ambassadors for Seoul Guro Kids International Film Festival (now Seoul International Children's Film Festival (SICFF)) 3 years in a row.

Awards and nominations

Notes

References

External links 
 
 
 
 

2003 births
Living people
South Korean male television actors
South Korean male film actors
South Korean male child actors
South Korean people of Chinese descent
Male actors from Seoul
21st-century South Korean male actors
School of Performing Arts Seoul alumni